John Maurice Beattie (1932 – 12 July 2017) was a British legal historian.

He as born in Dunstan near Newcastle upon Tyne, England and studied history at the University of San Francisco. He was awarded a master's degree by the University of California and a PhD by King's College, Cambridge, where his supervisor was John H. Plumb. Beattie was appointed to the University of Toronto's Department of History in 1961, where he was a member for 35 years.

His Crime and the Courts in England, 1660-1800 is considered a seminal work in criminal and legal history.

Works
'The Court of George I and English Politics, 1717-1720', The English Historical Review, Vol. 81, No. 318 (Jan., 1966), pp. 26–37.
The English Court in the Reign of George I (Cambridge: Cambridge University Press, 1967).
'The Pattern of Crime in England 1660-1800', Past & Present, No. 62 (Feb., 1974), pp. 47–95.
'The Criminality of Women in Eighteenth-Century England', Journal of Social History, Vol. 8, No. 4 (Summer, 1975), pp. 80–116.
Crime and the Courts in England, 1660-1800 (Princeton: Princeton University Press, 1986).
'Scales of Justice: Defense Counsel and the English Criminal Trial in the Eighteenth and Nineteenth Centuries', Law and History Review, Vol. 9, No. 2 (Autumn, 1991), pp. 221–267.
Policing and Punishment in London 1660-1750: Urban Crime and the Limits of Terror (Oxford: Oxford University Press, 2001).
'Sir John Fielding and Public Justice: The Bow Street Magistrates' Court, 1754-1780', Law and History Review, Vol. 25, No. 1 (Spring, 2007), pp. 61–10.
The First English Detectives: The Bow Street Runners and the Policing of London, 1750-1840 (Oxford: Oxford University Press, 2012).

Notes

1932 births
2017 deaths
British historians
Legal historians
University of San Francisco alumni
University of California alumni
Alumni of King's College, Cambridge
Academic staff of the University of Toronto
British expatriates in the United States